Red Fish Island is an island in Galveston County, Texas, near the community of Bacliff. It is located in Galveston Bay, northeast of San Leon. Its land is mostly rocky, but it also contains a beach where tourists visit the island.

See also
List of islands of Texas

References

Landforms of Chambers County, Texas
Islands of Texas